Go out may refer to:

 Go out (cards), to empty one's hand or achieve the target number of points in certain card games
 Go out policy, a Chinese overseas investment strategy
 Dating, socialising romantically with another person